Hasanabad (also Romanized as Ḩasanābād) is a village in Qarah Bagh Rural District, in the Central District of Shiraz County, Fars Province, Iran. At the 2006 census, its population was 577, in 135 families.

References 

Populated places in Shiraz County